Seyyed Hoseyn Kushki (also Romanized as Seyyed Ḩoseyn Kūshkī; also known as Chāh Shūreh-ye ‘Olyā and Chah Shureh-ye Mohammad Hoseyn) is a village in Tarhan-e Gharbi Rural District, Tarhan District, Kuhdasht County, Lorestan Province, Iran. At the 2006 census, its population was 307, in 56 families.

References 

Towns and villages in Kuhdasht County